Copperfield may refer to:

Places

Australia 

 Copperfield, Queensland, a pair of former copper mining towns, now within the locality of Clermont
 North Copperfield, Queensland, the northern town of Copperfield
 South Copperfield, Queensland, the southern town of Copperfield

 Copperfield College, a school in Melbourne, Victoria

Canada 

Copperfield, Calgary, neighbourhood in Calgary, Alberta, Canada
Copperfield's Mine, mine on Temagami Island, Ontario, Canada

United States 
Copperfield, Oregon, community in Oregon, United States
Copperfield, Texas, neighborhood in Harris County, Texas, United States
Copperfield, Austin, Texas, a neighbourhood in Austin, Texas
Copperfield, Illinois, a neighborhood in Dunlap

People
David Copperfield (disambiguation)
Copperfield, a fictional character in the video game The Suffering: Ties That Bind

Entertainment
Copperfield (musical), a musical based on Charles Dickens' book David Copperfield

de:Copperfield